Citizens Bank is a historic bank building located at South Bend, St. Joseph County, Indiana. It was built in 1913, and is a six-story, three bay, Commercial style brick building with a terra cotta front facade. A rear addition was constructed in 1923. At the central entrance bay is a front portico supported by Ionic order columns.

It was listed on the National Register of Historic Places in 1985.

References

Commercial buildings on the National Register of Historic Places in Indiana
Commercial buildings completed in 1913
Buildings and structures in South Bend, Indiana
National Register of Historic Places in St. Joseph County, Indiana
Chicago school architecture in Indiana